Nino Kirtadze (born 1 June 1968) is a Georgian-born French journalist, actress and film director. Since 1997 she has lived in France.

She starred in the 1996 film A Chef in Love as well as the 2008 film The Rainbowmaker. She directed the 2014 film Don't Breathe.

References

External links

Nino Kirtadze on Georgian National Filmography

1968 births
Living people
People from Tbilisi
Film directors from Georgia (country)
Women film directors from Georgia (country)
20th-century actresses from Georgia (country)
21st-century actresses from Georgia (country)